Alyssa Thomas (born April 12, 1992) is an American professional basketball forward for the Connecticut Sun of the Women's National Basketball Association (WNBA). She played college basketball for the Maryland Terrapins. The New York Liberty drafted Thomas 4th overall in the 2014 WNBA draft, and immediately traded her to the Sun along with Kelsey Bone and a 2015 first-round draft pick in exchange for Tina Charles. Thomas is the University of Maryland's all-time leader in scoring, rebounding and double-doubles for both the women's and men's programs, and one of only three athletes in NCAAW history with six career triple-doubles. Thomas is the only WNBA player to record four triple-doubles, which she did during the 2022 season.

Early years
Thomas attended Central Dauphin High School in Pennsylvania and became the school's all-time leading scorer. She was named to the 2010 Parade All-American First Team, and was named a unanimous 2010 ESPN and USA Today All-American. She was selected as the 2010 Pennsylvania AAAA State Player of the Year.

College career
In her freshman season, Thomas was named 2011 ACC Rookie of the Year and was selected to the All-ACC Second Team. She led her team in scoring, averaging 14.5 points per game, as well as 7.3 rebounds and 2.1 steals per game.

Thomas came to national attention in her sophomore season (2011-2012). After leading the ACC in scoring at 17.2 points per game, she was named the 2012 ACC Player of the Year and an AP, WBCA and USBWA First Team All-American. She led the Maryland Terrapins to the 2012 ACC Championship, scoring 29 points in the championship game against Georgia Tech and earning ACC Tournament MVP honors. The Terrapins went on to the Elite Eight of the NCAA Tournament, falling to Notre Dame in their final game of the 2011–2012 season.

In her junior year, Thomas became the first person in NCAA or WNBA history to average over 18 points, 10 rebounds and 5 assists for an entire season. She won ACC Player of the Year for a second time and led the injury-addled Terrapins to the Sweet Sixteen in the NCAA Tournament.

Thomas capped her collegiate career by earning 2014 ACC Player of the Year for a third straight season, in addition to AP, WBCA and USBWA First-Team All America honors. She led a young Terrapins squad on a deep run through the NCAA Tournament, scoring a career-high 33 points against the Tennessee Lady Vols in the Sweet Sixteen en route to reaching the 2014 Final Four in Nashville. The Terrapins were defeated by Notre Dame in the Final Four match-up. On June 27, 2014, Thomas was named ACC Female Athlete of the Year.

The University of Maryland honored Thomas's jersey in a ceremony on March 2, 2014.

Maryland  statistics
Source

Professional career

WNBA

Thomas was drafted 4th overall by the New York Liberty in the 2014 WNBA draft, and was draft-day traded to the Sun alongside Kelsey Bone. In her rookie season, she averaged 10.0 points and 5.1 rebounds in her with the Sun in 34 games with 28 starts. She was named to the 2014 WNBA All-Rookie Team.

After her rookie season, Thomas would continue her role as starting power forward for the Sun. In 2017, Thomas would emerge as an all-star in the league. She scored a career-high 26 points in an 86–76 win over the Washington Mystics. She would then be voted into the 2017 WNBA All-Star Game, making it her first career all-star game appearance. Thomas would finish off the season setting new career-highs in scoring, rebounding, assists and steals as the Sun made the playoffs as the number 4 seed with a 21–13 record, receiving a bye to the second round, making it their first playoff appearance since 2012. In her first career playoff game, Thomas scored 20 points and grabbed 10 rebounds in an 88–83 loss to the Phoenix Mercury.

In February 2018, Thomas re-signed with the Sun to a multi-year deal in free agency. On August 9, 2018, Thomas scored a season-high 22 points in a 101–92 victory over the Dallas Wings to help the Sun clinch a playoff spot. The Sun finished 21–13 with the number 4 seed and a bye to the second round. The Sun would yet again lose to the Phoenix Mercury in the second round elimination game by a final score of 96–86.

Shooting style
Thomas has a torn labrum in each shoulder.  Michael Rosenberg describes her one-handed shooting style in Sports Illustrated: "a shooting motion that looks like a waiter carrying a tray, then throwing it in the air and quitting." She is left-handed and learned ambidexterity while growing up. During Game 2 of the 2021 semifinals against the Las Vegas Aces Thomas dislocated her right shoulder. She returned to play in Game 3, scoring 23 points and 12 rebounds.

Overseas
In 2014–2015, Thomas played in South Korea for Bucheon KEB Hana Bank. She led the league in scoring and rebounding, averaging 19 points and 11.1 rebounds per game. In 2015–2016, 
Thomas signed in Turkey for Yakin Dogu. In the 2016-17 offseason, Thomas signed with Yongin Samsung Blueminx of the Korean League. In 2017, Thomas resigned with Yongin Samsung Blueminx for the 2017-18 off-season. In 2018, Thomas signed with USK Praha of the Czech League for the 2018-19 off-season.

WNBA career statistics

Regular season

|-
| style="text-align:left;"| 2014
| style="text-align:left;"| Connecticut
| 34 || 28 || 27.3 || .434 || .200 || .757 || 5.1 || 1.5 || 1.0 || 0.2 || 1.7 || 10.0
|-
| style="text-align:left;"| 2015
| style="text-align:left;"| Connecticut
| 24 || 23 || 26.0 || .411 || .000 || .692 || 5.3 || 1.4 || 1.2 || 0.2 || 1.7 || 8.8
|-
| style="text-align:left;"| 2016
| style="text-align:left;"| Connecticut
| 31 || 31 || 27.1 || .487 || .000 || .634 || 6.0 || 2.3 || 1.4 || 0.1 || 2.4 || 11.1
|-
| style="text-align:left;"| 2017
| style="text-align:left;"| Connecticut
| 33 || 33 || 29.8 || .509 || .000 || .567 || 6.8 || 4.5 || 1.5 || 0.4 || 2.9 || 14.8
|-
| style="text-align:left;"| 2018
| style="text-align:left;"| Connecticut
| 24 || 24 || 30.6 || .464 || .000 || .547 || 8.1 || 4.2 || 1.1 || 0.4 || 2.0 || 10.3
|-
| style="text-align:left;"| 2019
| style="text-align:left;"| Connecticut
| 34 || 34 || 30.2 || .505 || .000 || .496 || 7.8 || 3.1 || 1.9 || 0.4 || 2.0 || 11.6
|-
| style="text-align:left;"| 2020
| style="text-align:left;"| Connecticut
| 21 || 21 || 32.8 || .500 || .000 || .686 || 9.0 || 4.8 || 2.0 || 0.3 || 2.5 || 15.5
|-
| style="text-align:left;"| 2021
| style="text-align:left;"| Connecticut
| 3 || 0 || 12.3 || .267 || .000 || .750 || 3.3 || 1.3 || 0.3 || 0.0 || 1.0 || 3.7
|-
| style="text-align:left;"| 2022
| style="text-align:left;"| Connecticut
| 36 || 36 || 32.1 || .500 || .000 || .730 || 8.2 || 6.1 || 1.7 || 0.2 || 2.9 || 13.4
|-
| style="text-align:left;"| Career
| style="text-align:left;"| 9 years, 1 team
| 240 || 230 || 29.2 || .481 || .143 || .636 || 6.9 || 3.5 || 1.5 || 0.3 || 2.3 || 11.9

Playoffs

|-
| style="text-align:left;"| 2017
| style="text-align:left;"| Connecticut
| 1 || 1 || 32.0 || .667 || .000 || .667 || 10.0 || 1.0 || 2.0 || 0.0 || 6.0 || 20.0
|-
| style="text-align:left;"| 2018
| style="text-align:left;"| Connecticut
| 1 || 1 || 35.0 || .538 || .000 || 1.000 || 3.0 || 3.0 || 0.0 || 0.0 || 1.0 || 17.0
|-
| style="text-align:left;"| 2019
| style="text-align:left;"| Connecticut
| 8 || 8 || 37.0 || .532 || .000 || .778 || 9.3 || 6.6 || 2.4 || 0.1 || 2.1 || 16.0
|-
| style="text-align:left;"| 2020
| style="text-align:left;"| Connecticut
| 7 || 7 || 32.4 || .515 || .000 || .767 || 8.1 || 4.0 || 1.7 || 0.4 || 2.1 || 17.9
|-
| style="text-align:left;"| 2021
| style="text-align:left;"| Connecticut
| 4 || 0 || 23.3 || .408 || .000 || .636 || 6.0 || 3.8 || 1.5 || 0.5 || 1.3 || 11.8
|-
| style="text-align:left;"| 2022
| style="text-align:left;"| Connecticut
| 12 || 12 || 33.5 || .474 || .000 || .576 || 9.5 || 6.3 || 1.5 || 0.7 || 2.5 || 12.3
|-
| style="text-align:left;"| Career
| style="text-align:left;"| 6 years, 1 team
| 33 || 29 || 32.9 || .498 || .000 || .706 || 8.5 || 5.3 || 1.7 || 0.4 || 2.2 || 14.7

Personal life
Thomas is the older sister of former Wake Forest player Devin Thomas.
As of February 2021 she is in a romantic relationship with her Connecticut Sun teammate DeWanna Bonner.

See also
 List of NCAA Division I basketball career triple-doubles leaders

References

External links

Maryland Terrapins bio

1992 births
Living people
All-American college women's basketball players
American women's basketball players
Basketball players from Harrisburg, Pennsylvania
Connecticut Sun players
LGBT basketball players
LGBT people from Pennsylvania
Lesbian sportswomen
Maryland Terrapins women's basketball players
New York Liberty draft picks
Parade High School All-Americans (girls' basketball)
Power forwards (basketball)
Women's National Basketball Association All-Stars